SAPEI, is a high-voltage direct current power transmission system that connects Sardinia with the Italian mainland. It is the deepest submarine power cable in the world. The cable is owned and operated by Terna.

History 
The project was launched in 2006. Scientific surveys and studies of the sea floor began soon after. The first submarine cable as also onshore cables was laid in 2008 and the first voltage tests were conducted.  In 2009, the converter stations in Latina and Fiume Santo entered into operation.  Laying of the second submarine cable was scheduled for the end of 2010.  The submarine cable-laying activity was being carried out by the Giulio Verne, the largest cable-laying ship in the world. The cable was inaugurated on 17 March 2011.

Description
The system consists of a  submarine cable and  land cables. It has two poles, having a total capacity of 1,000 MW at 500 kV of voltage. It is connected to the alternating current grids through converter stations in Fiume Santo and Latina at 400 kV of voltage. The cable was manufactured by Prysmian and converter stations were manufactured by ABB. The project cost over €730 million.

See also 
 SACOI, the old HVDC link between Sardinia across Corsica to the Italian mainland.

References

HVDC transmission lines
Submarine power cables
Electric power infrastructure in Italy
2010 establishments in Italy
Energy infrastructure completed in 2010